The following is a list of transfers for the 2019Major League Soccer (MLS) season that have been made during the 2018–19 MLS offseason all the way through to the roster freeze on September 15, 2019.

Transfers

References 

2019

Major League Soccer
Major League Soccer